Mt Kenya United Football Club is a professional association football club based in Nairobi, Kenya. The club currently competes in the Kenyan Premier League after qualifying from the Kenyan National Super League at second position behind Posta Rangers.

The club changed its name from Nakumatt to Mt Kenya United in November 2018.

References

External links 
 

 Kenyan National Super League clubs
 FKF Division One clubs
 Football clubs in Kenya